Hashem Rajabzadeh is a Retired Professor of Osaka University, researcher, translator, and Japanese language expert.  He is an Iranian and he was born in 1941 in Tehran. He received a bachelor's degree in law from the University of Tehran and in 1973, he received a doctorate in human rights from the same university. His doctoral dissertation is titled Ritual of Government in the Ministry of Rashid al-Din Fazlullah Hamedani. Hashem Rajabzadeh was a member of the Ministry of Foreign Affairs of Iran in 1970, and from 1981 to 2011. He was a professor of Persian language and literature in the Department of Foreign Studies at Osaka University.
On 23 May 2009 during a ceremony he received the Order of the Sacred Treasure, awarded by the Emperor of Japan for his efforts to introduce Iranian culture and civilization to Japan and to introduce Japanese culture and literature to Iranians, for 27 years.

Works
History of Iran from Ilkhanids to Qajar era (14th to 20th Centuries)
Persian Literature
Japanese History and Literature

Education
Primary School:	Iran, Shari’t, and Râzî Primary Schools, Tehran, 1948–54
High School: Dar al-Fonoon High School, Graduated 1960
University: Tehran University, Faculty of Law and Political Sciences:
BA in Law, 1960–1964
MA in Law and Political Sciences, 1964–1968
PhD in Political Sciences and History, 1968–1972

Decoration
Order of the Sacred Treasure; Gold Rays with Rosette from the Japanese Emperor and Government, conferred on April 29, 2009.

History of Membership in Academic Associations
 Japanese Society for Near Eastern Studies (the Oriento Gakkai) 
 Japanese Society for Middle Eastern Studies (Nihon Chuto Gakkai)
 Society for Iranian Studies (North America)
 British Society for Middle Eastern Studies (BRISMES)
 Japanese Society for Iranian Studies
 Kansai Society for Iranian Studies
 Society for Iranian Studies
 Societas Iranologica Europaea (European Society for Iranian Studies))
 The International house of Japan (Nihon Kok)

See also
 Iran–Japan relations
 Academic Society of Iranians in Japan
 Iranian diaspora
 Persian manuscript in Japan
 Iranians in Japan

Ethnic groups in Japan
Japan

Sources 

 Hashem Rajabzadehのオンライン記事(ペルシア語)
 Aftab新聞のHashem Rajabzadehについての記事（ペルシア語）
ラジャブザーデさんの引っ越し 2020年5月7日閲覧。
https://ci.nii.ac.jp/naid/40015434245
 *گاه شمار روابط ایران و ژاپن تا انقلاب اسلامی و از 1998 تا 2020 
 
 

1941 births
Living people
Academic staff of Osaka University